Jürgen Frosch (born 7 May 1976), better known by his stage name Jay Frog, is a German DJ and house musician. He began a solo career when he departed the band Scooter in 2006. Since then he has released several singles on Kontor Records and various other labels.

References 

1976 births
Living people
German DJs
Electronic dance music DJs

de:Scooter (Band)#Jay Frog (2002 bis 2006)